Anthony M. Henderson is a brigadier general in the United States Marine Corps.

He was commissioned as a second lieutenant in 1989, and obtained a Juris Doctor degree from Southern University Law Center in 1994 with a view to become a staff judge advocate, but chose to join the combat arms. As a line officer, he saw action in Iraq and as a battalion commander in Afghanistan. There, his marines credited him with keeping almost all of them alive in a victorious battle against the Taliban at Jugroom Fort, Helmand Province in 2008, and stories of his personal courage in the engagement became part of Marine lore. He was appointed commander of the 13th Marine Expeditionary Unit in 2014. As of March 2021, he served as director of concepts and plans at the Marine Corps Warfighting Laboratory.

In March 2021, the Marine Corps selected and confirmed Henderson for promotion to brigadier general, pending Senate confirmation. The New York Times had previously reported that during the Trump administration, Henderson, who is African American, had been passed over for promotion thrice in favor of white men, despite a recommendation by Navy secretary Richard V. Spencer.

He was promoted to his current rank on July 1, 2021.

References 

United States Marine Corps colonels
African-American United States Navy personnel
Living people
Year of birth missing (living people)
21st-century African-American people